Ahiyeh (also Romanized as Āhīyeh; also known as ‘Alīābād-e Āhīyeh) is a village in Tarand Rural District, Jalilabad District, Pishva County, Tehran Province, Iran. At the 2006 census, its population was 275, in 53 families.

References 

Populated places in Pishva County